Elections to Bury Council took place on 3 May 2012. This was on the same day as other 2012 United Kingdom local elections.
One third of the Council was up for election and the Labour Party retained control of the Council.

17 seats were contested. The Labour Party won 14 seats, and the Conservatives won 3 seats.

After the election, the total composition of the council was as follows:
Labour 35
Conservative 14
Liberal Democrats 2

Election result

Ward results

References

2012 English local elections
2012
2010s in Greater Manchester